Yahoo! Kimo (Mandarin: Yahoo奇摩) is the Taiwanese version of Yahoo!, a web services provider based in the United States. In February 2001, Yahoo! Inc. acquired , a Taiwanese search engine, and in October 2001, Yahoo!

See also 

 Yahoo!

References

External links 
 

Taiwanese companies established in 2001
2001 establishments in Taiwan
Yahoo!
Internet search engines